Eliska Cross (born 6 January 1986) is a French film actress, pornographic actress and model.

Background
Cross started her career as stripper, then she entered the adult film industry in 2006. In 2009, she received two nominations at Hot d'Or for Best French Starlet and Best Actress Blog.

In 2010, Cross focused her career on photo modeling, stripteasing and mainstream cinema. Cross had a leading role in the 2010 low-budget horror film Echap. Her works also include the Serge Bramly's TV movie Rose c'est Paris, alongside Monica Bellucci, and Abdellatif Kechiche's award-winning drama film Black Venus. Cross also appeared in the France 2 documentary Rhabillage, directed by Ovidie and produced by Jean-Jacques Beineix.

References

External links

1986 births
Living people
French film actresses
French pornographic film actresses